The Seefeld Nordic Competence Centre (In German: Nordisches Kompetenzzentrum) is a multi-sport venue for nordic skiing located in Seefeld in Tirol, Austria. It consists of a cross-country skiing stadium, the Toni-Seelos-Olympiaschanzes with two ski jumping hills; a normal hill and a medium hill and a shooting range for biathlon. It has previously hosted the 1976 Winter Olympics and the FIS Nordic World Ski Championships in 1985 and 2019.

Built in 1985 in preparation for the Nordic World Championships, the centre has been continually expanded and modernised. In 2005, a central building at the foot of the ski jump was constructed in the Casino Arena to enable more extensive use of facilities.

Sports facilities 
In recent years Seefeld has expanded and renovated its sports facilities and positioned itself as the Nordic Skill Centre (Nordisches Kompetenzzentrum) for the training of national teams and clubs as well as the Stams Skiing Grammar School (Skigymnasium Stams).

 Toni Seelos Olympic Ski Jumps in the Casino Arena on the northwest slopes of the Gschwandtkopf (HS 109 and HS 75)
 Biathlon stand with 30 firing points
 279 km of courses for cross-country skiing, 125 km of which is for skating and 154 km for classic cross-country skiing
 Snow-making facilities
 Asphalt roller skiing route with a length of 3.6 km and width of 3 m with variations from 560 m to 4.7 km
 FIS-homologated courses for slalom and giant slalom on the Gschwandtkopf 
 Ski areas of Rosshütte, Gschwandtkopf and Geigenbühel-/Birkenlifte
 Ice rinks for skating and Bavarian curling
 Two grass areas for football, another is planned
 WM Halle with 8 indoor tennis courts and 4 outside courts
 Seefeld Tennis Club with 6 clay courts
 Golf courses: Seefeld-Reith Golf Club (9 hole, par 70) and Panorama golf course of am Geigenbühel, an 18-hole course in Wildmoos (Telfs)
 266 km waymarked running and Nordic walking routes
 570 km  of cycling and mountain bike routes
 Beach volleyball court
 Two riding halls with outdoor riding paddocks
 Fitness studio

Notable events

References

External links
Home page

Sports venues completed in 1985
Innsbruck-Land District
1985 establishments in Austria
Sports venues in Tyrol (state)